The discography of Scottish singer-songwriter Sandi Thom includes five studio albums, 13 singles and one compilation album.

Albums

Studio albums

Demo albums

Compilation albums

Live albums

Singles

References

Discographies of British artists
Folk music discographies
Pop music discographies